The 2016–17 Sydney Thunder WBBL season was the second in the team's history. Coached by Joanne Broadbent and captained by Alex Blackwell, the team competed in the WBBL02 tournament.

At the conclusion of the group stage, the Thunder team was sixth on the table, and therefore did not qualify for the knockout phase.

Squad
The following is the Thunder women squad for WBBL|02.  Players with international caps are listed in bold.

Sources

Ladder

Fixtures

Group stage

References

2016–17 Women's Big Bash League season by team
Sydney Thunder (WBBL)